Leonard Wolf (March 1, 1923 – March 20, 2019) was a Romanian-American poet, author, teacher, and translator. He is known for his authoritative annotated editions of classic gothic horror novels, including Dracula, Frankenstein, The Strange Case of Dr Jekyll and Mr Hyde, and The Phantom of the Opera, and other critical works on the topic; and also for his Yiddish translations of works ranging from those of Isaac Bashevis Singer to Winnie-the-Pooh. He was the father of Naomi Wolf.

Life and career
Born in Vulcan, Romania (Transylvania), Wolf was originally named 'Ludovic', which was changed upon his arrival in the United States in 1930 with his mother, Rose-ita, older brother, Maxim (Mel) and younger sister, Shirly. He wrote and published numerous poems, short stories, book reviews and articles, and was part of the Berkeley Renaissance of the late 1940s and 1950s.  He was a professor of English at San Francisco State University (SFSU) until moving to New York around 1980, focussing on teaching poetry. He is the author of several books including A Dream of Dracula, Blood Thirst, 100 Years of Vampire Fiction (editor), Bluebeard : The Life and Crimes of Gilles De Rais, Doubles, Dummies and Dolls : Twenty-One Terror Tales of Replication (editor), Dracula : the Connoisseur's Guide, False Messiah, Horror - A Connoisseur's Guide To Literature And Film, Monsters: Twenty Terrible and Wonderful Beasts From The Classic Dragon And Colossal Minotaur To King Kong And The Great Godzilla, Quiromancia/ Chiromancy, The False Messiah, Voices from the love generation (Little, Brown, 1968), The Glass Mountain: A Novel (Overlook Press, 1993), The Passion of Israel [By] Leonard Wolf. Interviews Taken and Edited in Collaboration with Deborah Wolf, Wolf's Complete Book of Terror (editor), and  Vini-Der-Pu: A Yiddish version of Winnie the Pooh (Dutton 2000).

Wolf lived in New York. He was commissioned by Farrar, Straus & Giroux to write a biography of Isaac Bashevis Singer.

The Treehouse: Eccentric Wisdom from My Father on How to Live, Love and See, by his daughter Naomi was published by Simon & Schuster in 2005.

He died on March 20, 2019 in Corvallis, Oregon.

Happening House
While teaching at San Francisco State University in 1967, Wolf founded Happening House, one of many organizations that originated with the hippies of the Haight Ashbury district. It was conceived as an alternate university, an arts center and a place of learning. It often planned and sponsored social events such as softball games and free concerts. In collaboration with the Haight Ashbury Switchboard it had intermittent connections with the Haight Ashbury Free Clinic.

References

External links
 Leonard Wolf at Fantastic Fiction

 

1923 births
2019 deaths
People from Vulcan, Hunedoara
20th-century American novelists
American male novelists
American horror writers
American non-fiction crime writers
American academics of English literature
Romanian emigrants to the United States
Romanian Ashkenazi Jews
Jewish American writers
San Francisco State University faculty
American film historians
Translators from Yiddish
20th-century translators
American male short story writers
20th-century American short story writers
20th-century American male writers
20th-century American non-fiction writers
American male non-fiction writers
21st-century American Jews